My Husband Sleeps At Home Today (Mi marido hoy duerme en casa) is a 1955 Argentine film directed by Enrique Carreras from a script by Abel Santa Cruz. It stars Leonor Rinaldi, Francisco Álvarez, May Avril and Gogó Andreu and was released on October 13, 1955. May Avril was at that time a star of the Folies Bergère's revue cast.

Plot

Sons and sons-in-law hatch a plan to reunite a recently separated marriage.

Cast
  Leonor Rinaldi
  Francisco Álvarez
  May Avril
  Gogó Andreu
  Tono Andreu
  Olga Gatti
  Adrianita
  Carmen Campoy
  Héctor Armendáriz
  Gerardo Chiarella
  Emilio Vieyra
  Diana Stevani
  Carlos Gustavo Jackson
  Alfredo Aristu
  Rosita Vanders
  Pablo Indovino

Reception
Set magazine wrote (translated from Spanish): "Simple adaptation that does not hide in its realization its stage provenance. A comic and nonsensical film for an undemanding audience." Noticias Gráficas said that "There is always someone who laughs at things that are so hackneyed. "

References

External links
 

1955 films
1950s Spanish-language films
Argentine black-and-white films
Films directed by Enrique Carreras
1950s Argentine films